Anna Jobarteh is an English actress,  known for portraying the role of Ruth Kirby on the BBC school drama Waterloo Road. She also played a role in thriller series Paradox in 2009, when she played the role of Dionne Hudson. She later starred as Christie in a show called Combat Kids on the CBBC Channel in 2010.

Career
Jobarteh began portraying the role of Kirby in the BBC drama Waterloo Road in September 2010, in the first episode of the sixth series, and her character departed  at the end of the series. In February 2020, Jobarteh portrayed the role of Kayla Miller in an episode of the BBC soap opera Doctors.

See also
List of Waterloo Road characters

References

1996 births
English television actresses
English child actresses
Living people